El Concierto Tour was a concert tour performed by Luis Miguel, to further promote the album El Concierto which began on September 15, 1995, at the Circus Maximus Showroom in Las Vegas, Nevada and performed across several cities in the United States, Puerto Rico, Mexico and Venezuela. In November 19, Luis Miguel did a special appearance in Sinatra: 80 Years My Way, a television special celebrating Frank Sinatra's 80th birthday, which was held at the Shrine Auditorium in Los Angeles, performing the song Come Fly With Me.

The setlist of the tour consists of previously recorded pop tracks and ballads, boleros from his Romance albums, and the mariachi songs from El Concierto. The tour concluded on December 31 in Acapulco.

Tour set list

Tour dates

Note: Some dates may be missing due to the lack of reliable sources.

Box office score data

Cancelled shows

Band
Vocals: Luis Miguel
Acoustic & electric guitar: Kiko Cibrian
Bass: Lalo Carrillo
Piano: Francisco Loyo
Keyboards: Arturo Pérez
Drums: Victor Loyo
Percussion: Leonardo López
Saxophone: Jeff Nathanson
Trumpet: Armando Cedillo 
Trumpet: Juan Arpero
Trombone: Alejandro Carballo
Bandoneón: Coco Potenza
Backing vocals: Unknown
Mariachi 2000

Notes

References

Luis Miguel concert tours
1995 concert tours

pt:El Concierto Tour